Ernest Dixon (10 July 1901 – 27 April 1941) was a footballer born in Pudsey, England who played as a forward in The Football League in the 1920s and 1930s.

He played for Bradford City, Halifax Town, Burnley, Huddersfield Town, Nelson and Tranmere Rovers.

He is Halifax's all-time record goalscorer with 132 goals in all competitions.

At the end of his career, he also had spells in non-league football with Gresley Rovers .

References

1901 births
1941 deaths
Sportspeople from Pudsey
Association football forwards
English Football League players
Bradford City A.F.C. players
Halifax Town A.F.C. players
Burnley F.C. players
Huddersfield Town A.F.C. players
Nelson F.C. players
Tranmere Rovers F.C. players
Gresley F.C. players
Mossley A.F.C. players
English footballers